Humza Ferozie (born 22 February 1974) is an Indian former cricketer. He played thirteen first-class matches for Bengal between 1995 and 2002.

See also
 List of Bengal cricketers

References

External links
 

1974 births
Living people
Indian cricketers
Bengal cricketers
Cricketers from Kolkata